"With Every Bit of Me" is a Swedish English language single by Maltese singer Kevin Borg, winner of the Swedish version of Idol in its fifth season in 2008, and released as a single the same year. The single debuted at number one on the Swedish Real Tones Chart on 23 December 2009 and remained there for three weeks, making it both the Swedish Christmas and the New Year number one. It was replaced at the top spot the next-coming two weeks by Abba's "Happy New Year" (week 2) and Lady Gaga single, "Poker Face" (week 3), but Borg placed at number two instead for those weeks. Furthermore, the single peaked at number one on the Swedish single chart, remaining at the top position in four consecutive weeks. The song also charted at Svensktoppen, where it stayed for 10 weeks between 18 January-22 March 2009 before leaving the chart. Subsequently, the song topped the chart between 25 January-1 March the same year. The song also appeared on Kevin Borg's debut studio album The Beginning. The single was also certified Gold in Sweden.

Charts

See also 
List of Swedish number-one hits

References

2008 singles
Number-one singles in Sweden
English-language Swedish songs
Songs written by Andreas Carlsson
2008 songs